Australian Aboriginal people have many ways to source sweet foods. The four main types of sweet foods gathered – apart from ripe fruit – were:

 honey from ants and bees (sugarbag, see below)
 leaf scale (honeydew – lerps)
 tree sap
 flower nectar

In some parts of Australia, these customs are still used today, particularly in Central Australia. Foods collected can be eaten directly as a sweet or made into a sweet drink.

Arrernte sweet foods and drinks

The Arrernte of Central Australia divide their food up into a number of groups. Many other groups also do this or did this traditionally. The Arrernte word for sweet foods is Ngkwarle — honey-like foods.

Some Aboriginal people who still have their language often refer to alcohol by this sweet food group term.

Other sweet foods and drinks
The practices of the Arrernte were widely practised by many other groups across Australia. But customs varied depending on where people lived. Some other notable sweet foods include:

 Banksia: People placed the flower spike in a paperbark-lined hole filled with water to make a sweet drink.
 Grevillea: Nectar shaken and eaten, or mixed with water to make a sweet drink.
Xanthorrhoea: Sweet drink from nectar by soaking in water.

See also

References

Bushfood
Australian Aboriginal bushcraft
Insects as food
Bush medicine
Australian cuisine-related lists
Dessert-related lists